Mgr. Zacchaeus Okoth (born 5 July 1942) is a retired Roman Catholic Archbishop of Kisumu in Kenya.

Biography 
Okoth was ordained a priest on 13 November 1968. He was appointed Bishop of Kisumu on 27 February 1978, and became Archbishop when Kisumu was elevated to an archdiocese in 1990. Okoth was actively involved in politics during his career, having argued that the passage 2010 constitutional referendum was not enough to end the "culture of impunity among political leadership". Okoth retired in 2019 after over five decades as a priest.

Corruption allegations 
Okoth has been accused by parish officials and other priests of corruption. According to one report, Okoth routinely mismanaged church funds and went as far as to harass other priests.

References

Sources
 Catholic Hierarchy: Zacchaeus Okoth

1942 births
Living people
20th-century Roman Catholic archbishops in Kenya
Place of birth missing (living people)
21st-century Roman Catholic archbishops in Kenya
Roman Catholic archbishops of Kisumu
Roman Catholic bishops of Kisumu
Kenyan Roman Catholic bishops